Alan Early is an Irish graphic designer. He was previously a writer known for his trilogy series, the Father of Lies Chronicles. 

He grew up in Mohill, County Leitrim. He studied in the National Film School at Dún Laoghaire Institute of Art, Design and Technology and then later studied Moving Image Design at National College of Art and Design.

Bibliography

Father of Lies Chronicles
Arthur Quinn and the World Serpent (2011)
Arthur Quinn and the Fenris Wolf (2012)
Arthur Quinn and Hell's Keeper (2013)

References

External links
 

Living people
Irish male writers
Place of birth missing (living people)
1983 births